Crateranthus talbotii is a species of woody plant in the Lecythidaceae family. It is found in Cameroon and Nigeria. Its natural habitats are subtropical or tropical moist lowland forests and subtropical or tropical swamps. It is threatened by habitat loss.

References

Lecythidaceae
Flora of Cameroon
Flora of Nigeria
Vulnerable plants
Taxonomy articles created by Polbot